Cattleya schofieldiana is a species of bifoliate Cattleya orchid.

External links

schofieldiana
schofieldiana